Thomas Courtney Brownlee (21 May 1935 – 16 December 2018) was a Scottish professional footballer who played as a centre forward.

Brownlee's career started at Broxburn Athletic before he moved to England, with Walsall. His career then took him to York City, Workington in an exchange deal with Gus Alexander, non-league Netherfield and Bradford City, where he was the club's top goal-scorer in 1964–65 scoring 14 goals in just 18 games. After just seven games the following season he returned to Netherfield.

Brownlee was born in Carnwath, Scotland, in May 1935 and died in December 2018 at the age of 83.

References

External links

1935 births
2018 deaths
Footballers from South Lanarkshire
Association football forwards
Scottish footballers
Broxburn Athletic F.C. players
Alloa Athletic F.C. players
Walsall F.C. players
York City F.C. players
Workington A.F.C. players
Kendal Town F.C. players
Bradford City A.F.C. players
Scottish Football League players
English Football League players